Josiah Burgess (1689–1719) was an English pirate active in the Caribbean. He is best known as one of the heads of New Providence’s “Flying Gang.”

History

Burgess was leading a pack of four ships near Panama in September 1716. Outgunned by three Royal Navy warships, he waited until the warships sent crews ashore to gather water. His crew then paddled out of hiding, taking the Navy sailors’ small boat and capturing all of them, leaving the warships undermanned.

Alongside Benjamin Hornigold and Henry Jennings, Burgess was among the most influential pirates in Nassau in early 1717. That September King George offered a pardon to all pirates who surrendered within a year. Captain Vincent Pearse of  sailed to the Caribbean in March 1718 to deliver the news. The "commanders and ringleaders" of the pirates - Burgess, Hornigold, Francis Leslie, and Thomas Nichols - implored Pearse to release Charles Vane and other prisoners as an enticement to the other gathered pirates. Pearse relented, and over 200 pirates surrendered, including Burgess.

In order to receive the King's Pardon, Burgess sailed his sloop Providence to Charles Town, planning to bring trade goods back to the Bahamas. He was intercepted in May 1718 by Blackbeard, who questioned him about the harbor's resident merchants and naval defenses. Familiar with Burgess from his days sailing with Hornigold, Blackbeard bought Burgess' merchandise and let him go, after which Burgess sailed to Jamaica.

Woodes Rogers arrived in Nassau in July 1718 to re-announce and enforce the King's pardon. He was greeted by the crews of several pardoned pirates, Burgess' former crew among them. Burgess himself returned to Nassau where Rogers employed him as a Justice of the Vice-Admiralty Court and a privateer. In 1719 Burgess' ship was lost at sea off of Abaco, where he drowned. Young sailor and former pirate George Rounsivell also died trying to rescue Burgess; Rogers had pardoned the teenage Rounsivell when he first arrived in Nassau.

See also
Admiralty court, the Court which tried Rounsivell and on which Burgess would later serve.

Notes

References

 

18th-century pirates
British pirates
1719 deaths
Caribbean pirates
1689 births
Pardoned pirates